The 6th Arizona State Legislature, consisting of the Arizona State Senate and the Arizona House of Representatives, was constituted from January 1, 1923, to December 31, 1924, during the last two years of George W. P. Hunt's fourth tenure as Governor of Arizona, in Phoenix.

Sessions
The Legislature met for the regular session at the State Capitol in Phoenix on January 7, 1923; and adjourned on March 10.

There was no special session, which would have met during 1924, during this legislature.

State Senate

Members
The asterisk (*) denotes members of the previous Legislature who continued in office as members of this Legislature.

Employees
 Secretary: L. S. Williams
 Assistant Secretary: NELLIE A. HAYWARD Nellie A. Hayward
 Sergeant-at-Arms: C. B. Kelton
 Chaplain: Reverend Bertrand R. Cocks 
 Doorkeeper: A. F. Banta

House of Representatives

Members
The asterisk (*) denotes members of the previous Legislature who continued in office as members of this Legislature.

References

Arizona legislative sessions
1923 in Arizona
1924 in Arizona
1923 U.S. legislative sessions
1924 U.S. legislative sessions